Mikkel Wohlgemuth (born 4 June 1995) is a Danish professional footballer who plays as a midfielder for FC Fredericia,

Career
Wohlgemuth played his youth years and first senior years at FC Copengagen. Wohlgemuth was a part of Copenhagen's 2013–14 UEFA Youth League campaign, where he went to score against Juventus and Real Madrid, both at home.

Wohlgemuth made his Superliga debut on 16 May 2013, as he was in the starting lineup away against Randers FC.

On 2 June 2014, Wohlgemuth suffered an anterior cruciate ligament injury in a match for the Denmark under-19 national team against Germany. The injury is expected to keep him out the game for the rest of the year. He was anyway promoted to the first team of F.C. Copenhagen on 27 June 2014.

After playing for HB Køge for three years, Wohlgemuth signed with Vendsyssel FF in August 2018, who had just won promotion to the Superliga. There, he suffered a series of injuries, sidelining him for more than a year. He made his comeback in October 2020, where he provided an assist to Jakob Hjorth in a 1–1 draw against Fredericia. He left the club at the end of the 2020-21 season at the end of his contract. However, he signed a new two-year deal with Vendsyssel on 20 July 2021. On 26 June 2022 it was confirmed, that Wohlgemuth had signed a two-year contract with fellow league club, FC Fredericia.

Honours 
FC Copenhagen
Danish Superliga: 2012–13
Danish Cup: 2014–15

References

External links 
  National team profile
  Mikkel Wohlgemuth on Soccerway

1995 births
Danish men's footballers
Danish Superliga players
F.C. Copenhagen players
HB Køge players
Living people
Association football midfielders
Vendsyssel FF players
Danish 1st Division players
Fremad Amager players
FC Fredericia players
Denmark youth international footballers
Footballers from Copenhagen